Agathe de Rambaud was born in Versailles as Agathe-Rosalie Mottet and was baptized in the future cathedral Saint-Louis of Versailles, on 10 December 1764. She died in Aramon, in the département of Gard, on 19 October 1853. She was the official nurse of the royal children, and particularly in charge of the Dauphin from 1785 to 1792.

Before the French Revolution 

Rambaud was born the daughter of Louis Melchior Mottet, Haut Commissaire of the French colonies, and of Jeanne Agathe Le Proux de La Rivière, who was the daughter of a First Commissioner of the French Navy . She was the granddaughter of the Baron Claude Nicolas Louis Mottet de La Motte, officer of the Royal Fox hunt, and the niece of Baron Benoît Mottet de La Fontaine, the last French Governor of Pondicherry. She was also related to Pierre-Jean-Baptiste Chaussard. She was sometimes given the courtesy title of Countess of Ribécourt.

She married André Rambaud, a member of the bourgeoisie of Marseille, Captain and Knight of the Order of Saint Louis, on 7 March 1785, in Versailles, at the church of Saint Louis. The witnesses of the bride were the French admiral Pierre André de Suffren and Louis Thomas Villaret de Joyeuse. This marriage made her the sister-in-law of Georges-René Pléville Le Pelley, the future admiral and minister of the French First Republic.

Auguste de Rambaud, their first child, was born on 11 January 1786 and baptized the following day at the Saint-Louis parish of Versailles. The godfather was his uncle Georges-René Pléville Le Pelley, Captain of the French Royal Navy, future admiral and minister of the Navy and the colonies under the Directoire. When Madeleine Célinie de Rambaud was born at Versailles on 29 July 1787, her father was no longer living with the family, as he had been named Commander of three forts and governor of the kingdom of Galam, for the Company of Senegal. In 1789, he was killed at Fort Saint-Joseph de Galam.

In 1785, Agathe de Rambaud was chosen by Queen Marie Antoinette to be the berceuse des enfants de France, the official nurse, of her second son Louis-Charles, Duke of Normandy, who became the Dauphin at the death of his elder brother Louis-Joseph, Dauphin of France in 1789. Of her relationship with Louis-Charles, Alain Decaux wrote:

Madame de Rambaud was officially in charge of the care of the Dauphin from the day of his birth until 10 August 1792, in other words for seven years. During these seven years, she never left him, she cradled him, took care of him, dressed him, comforted him, scolded him. Ten times, a hundred times, more than Marie Antoinette, she was a true mother for him.Alain Decaux, Louis XVII retrouvé, 1947, p. 306.

From the French Revolution to the First French Empire 
Agathe de Rambaud fled the Palais des Tuileries during the Insurrection of 10 August 1792 with Jean-Baptiste Cléry, who speaks at length about her in his Journal de ce qui s'est passé à la tour du Temple pendant la captivité de Louis XVI (Journal about what took place in the Prison Temple during the imprisonment of Louis XVI). She escaped the palace and was given refuge by a Monseur le Dreux at a house nearby were Cléry, who had escaped the palace by jumping out of a window, was also hiding, and was escorted out of Paris to her parents i Versailles by Cléry the following day.  They narrowly avoided prison at the Abbey of Saint Germain des Prés, where many prisoners were killed during the September massacres.

From the first days of the Royal Family's captivity, Rambaud asked in vain to serve at the Temple, where the young Dauphin and his parents had been imprisoned. Though she did not flee the country, Rambaud, and some of her family, were forced into hiding because of her relationship with the Royal family. After the Thermidorian Reaction, many of her friends and family, become incited by Freemasonry and new ideals, and zealously serve the French First Republic, the French Consulate and the First French Empire. She herself becomes close to many ministers, some generals, the mayor of Toulouse, and the scientist Philippe-Isidore Picot de Lapeyrouse.

Bourbon Restoration 
Eventually, her son Auguste resigned from his post in the First French Empire, joined with allied forces loyal to Louis XVII, and reached Compiègne on 29 March 1814. The family joined in the new regime, expecting a return to their previous station. Nevertheless, their expectations quickly disappeared as on 6 September 1815, Agathe obtained only a 1000 franc pension, from the King because of her previous official position as nurse of the Dauphin. Auguste, War Commissioner at Gand, was paid only half-salary. However, at Montfort-l'Amaury Agathe was able to reacquaint herself with Marie-Thérèse-Charlotte of France, Caroline Ferdinande Louise, duchesse de Berry, and Louise-Elisabeth, Marquise de Tourzel.

When Louis XVIII died, she was received at Court more frequently. Her granddaughter remembered seeing her grandmother talking with the Duchess of Angoulême, during the King’s visit to Naples, in 1827, at the castle, where Charles X, rested his hand upon our heads, asking each of us our age, he chatted a few moments with our grandmother and inquired about her interests.

She was received in Parisian genteel society as well, as a friend of Count Charles d'Hozier, Philippe-Louis-Marc-Antoine de Noailles, 1st duc de Mouchy, and the Duke Sosthene de La Rochefoucauld, who would write:

 Madame de Rambaud was a very honourable lady. The persons the present Louis XVII was first interested in... were not able to face the testimony of a very honorable lady, formerly in the service of the Royal Family, and who testified that the person who had been introduced to her was, according to her perfect knowledge, the son of the august Marie- Antoinette.

July Monarchy 
The July Revolution had no negative consequences upon the life of Agathe de Rambaud. She was able to retain her 1000 franc pension due to her role as the "former lady of the chamber of the Dauphin, son of Louis XVI," and her daughter-in-law Thérèse Gaudelet de Rambaud, received a 600 franc pension as a "child of the former servants of the House of the King’s children." However, her son, realizing at Vendôme that his future in the army was nonexistent, left for India and later for Mexico city, where he died in 1834. After his death, Thérèse Gaudelet married the count Amédée d'Allonville, leaving Agathe to raise her grandchildren Ernest, who would study at École Polytechnique, and Ernestine.

As this was happening, Karl Wilhelm Naundorff came into her life, pretending to be the now adult Louis XVII. For over a year, he lived at her home as she questioned him at length, testing him with old keepsakes. She also verified his birthmarks which seemed identical to those she noted on the young Dauphin at the request of Marie Antoinette. She fought a long battle to attest to his rights, enduring searches of her home where police seized a number of documents, files, and even presents presented to her from the Royal family.

Death
Agathe de Rambaud would eventually die at Aramon. She lived there for years at the home of her granddaughter's husband, rue Banasterie à Avignon, by the Palais des Papes.

She was first buried at Aramon, then her body was transferred to the new family tomb at St.Véran in Avignon,. A street in Avignon bears her maiden name of Agathe Rosalie Mottet and she is named among noted persons from Avignon at the town hall.

References

Further reading

Sources and documents
 Otto Friedrichs,Correspondence intime et inédite de Louis XVII, Charles-Louis, duc de Normandie "Naundorff" avec sa famille : 1834–1838 / avec introduction, notes et éclaircissements historiques en partie tirés des archives secrètes de Berlin par Otto Friedrichs, préface par Jules Bois. – Paris : H. Dargon, 1904–1905. – 2v : ill.
 Jean-Baptiste Cléry, Journal de ce qui s'est passé à la tour du Temple pendant la captivité de Louis XVI, Londres, 1798.
 Gruau, dit de la Barre, Abrégé de l'histoire des infortunes du Dauphin depuis l'époque où il a été enlevé de la Tour du Temple, jusqu'au moment de son arrestation par le gouvernement de Louis-Philippe of France, et de son expulsion en Angleterre ; suivi de quelques documents à l'appui des faits racontés par le Prince, et des incidents qui ont si péniblement traversé sa vie. À Londres, chez C. Armand, nov. 1836, Rédigé en collaboration avec Karl Wilhelm Naundorff. Le 21 novembre 1836.

Papers

 Guy de Rambaud, Pour l’amour du Dauphin, Anovi, 2005, . Biographie d'Agathe de Rambaud 
 
 Alain Decaux, Louis XVII retrouvé, Perrin, 1947
 Georges Bordonove, Louis XVII et l'énigme du Temple, 1995
 Philippe Delorme, L'Affaire Louis XVII, Tallandier 1995
 Philippe Delorme, Louis XVII, La vérité, édition Pygmalion

External documents
 Mémoires de Jean-Baptiste Cléry,son évasion des Tuileries, puis de Paris avec Madame de Rambau
 Intrigues dévoilées, ou, Louis XVII, dernier roi légitime de France ou Louis XVII, dernier roi le ..., Par John Boyd Thacher Collection (Library of Congress), Modeste Gruau de La Barre
 The Terrific Register Or, Record of Crimes, Judgments, Providences, and Calamities ...
 The Gentleman's Magazine
 The KnickerbockerOr, New-York Monthly Magazine
 Histoire de la révolution française, Par Louis Blanc ...
  Mémoires d'un contemporain que la Révolution fit orphelin en 1793, et qu'elle raya du nombre des... Par Henri Ethelbert Louis Victor Hébert
 Naundorff; ou, Mémoire à consulter sur l'intrigue du dernier des faux Louis XVII suivi des ...  Par A.-F.-V. Thomas
 Benoît Mottet de La Fontaine

Late portrait of Agathe de Rambaud

Documentary

 14 Aug. 1957 : Un nommé Charles Naundorf, Énigmes de l'histoire, Stellio Lorenzi, Alain Decaux and André Castelot. Berthe Bovy, sociétaire honoraire de la Comédie-Française, was Madame de Rambaud  La télévision dans la République, les années 50, de Marie-Françoise Lévy, Evelyne Cohen, p. 210.

1764 births
1853 deaths
18th-century French people
19th-century French people
18th-century French women
19th-century French women
People from Versailles
Governesses to the Children of France
Louis XVII